Basta is a hamlet on the island of Yell in the Shetland islands of Scotland. It is on the shores of Basta Voe and is in the parish of Yell.

References

External links

Canmore - Yell, Basta Voe site record

Villages in Yell, Shetland